Harvard Papers in Botany is a peer-reviewed scientific journal published twice a year, in June and December. It covers all aspects of plants and fungi including longer monographs, floristics, economic botany, and the history of botany.

Harvard Papers in Botany was initiated in 1989 to consolidate the following journals published by the Harvard University Herbaria:

 Botanical Museum Leaflets, Harvard University (Volumes 1–30, 1932–1986)
 Occasional Papers of the Farlow Herbarium of Cryptogamic Botany (Numbers 1–19, 1969–1987)
 Contributions from the Gray Herbarium of Harvard University
 Farlowia: A Journal of Cryptogamic Botany

Starting with No. 8, Harvard Papers in Botany also incorporates these journals:

 Journal of the Arnold Arboretum (Volumes 1–71, 1920–1990)
 Journal of the Arnold Arboretum Supplementary Series (Number 1, 1991)

Volumes 10 (2005) to present are available online at BioOne.

References

External links
 Harvard Papers in Botany
 Harvard Papers in Botany at SCImago Journal Rank
 Harvard Papers in Botany at HathiTrust Digital Library
 Harvard Papers in Botany at Botanical Scientific Journals

Harvard University academic journals
Botany journals
Biannual journals